One Small Hitch is a 2012 American romantic comedy film directed by John Burgess and written by Dode B. Levenson. Shane McRae stars as Josh Shiffman, who learns that his father is dying and his only regret is that he will not get to meet the woman who will one day become his son's wife. Desperate to fulfill his dad's final wish, Josh claims that he already met that woman, Molly Mahoney, who is played by Aubrey Dollar.

Plot 
Molly Mahoney is going home for her mother's wedding, and is bringing her boyfriend Lance to meet her family. Knowing they will be skeptical of him if she tells them he's in a band, she doesn't tell them anything about him, including his name. En route to the airport she discovers he's married and breaks up with him. At the airport, Molly meets up with Josh Shiffman, her brother's playboy best friend from childhood, as he is also flying from LA to Chicago for the wedding.

While waiting at the airport with Molly, Josh receives a call from his parents and learns that his dad, Max, is expected to die of cancer in the next 6 months. His father says that his only regret is not seeing the woman his son would marry. Josh, in a moment of panic, says that it is Molly. She agrees to play along for the weekend.

At Molly's mother's wedding, Josh reconnects with a former flame, Giselle Brousard. After telling her the truth about the fake engagement, they begin a friends with benefits relationship. While Molly says the relationship isn't a problem, she eventually begins to feel jealous of Giselle. Josh's parents ask Josh and Molly to stay longer to help with Josh's family's framing shop, as Max's health is failing. They agree, and the family starts to plan the wedding. Josh continues to see Giselle, and Molly tries to date other men.

One night, Josh is with his dad who asks him if he's happy with Molly, stating that being truly in love means you can be yourself with the other person. Josh replies that he is more comfortable with Molly than anyone else he knows. The same night, Molly attends her surprise bachelorette party where Molly describes Josh as one she could spend the rest of her life with. Josh overhears this and walks away in confusion before he is discovered. That night, they have sex. The next day, as they jokingly register for their wedding, Josh and Molly run into Giselle. Josh and Giselle flirt and Molly is upset.

Later, in front of their parents, Molly ends the engagement, saying she can't do this anymore. Josh chases after her and she admits that she loves him, returns his grandmother's ring, and leaves. Josh ends the "benefits" part of his relationship with Giselle and confesses he may love Molly.

Meanwhile, Josh's father has what the family thinks is a heart attack. Josh and Giselle rush to the hospital where Molly and the family are waiting. Josh's mother angrily reveals she knew he was having an affair and is horrified that he would bring Giselle to the hospital. Josh finally admits the truth; that he and Molly are not engaged.

After much yelling, Josh admits that he loves Molly. Molly, surprised, punches him. When Josh regains consciousness, he proposes to Molly. She accepts and they kiss. After a fade to black, we see Josh and Molly in the delivery room as they have their first baby. They name him Max.

Cast 
 Shane McRae as Josh Shiffman
 Aubrey Dollar as Molly Mahoney
 Daniel J. Travanti as Max Shiffman
 Janet Ulrich Brooks as Frida Shiffman
 Ron Dean as Art Burke
 Mary Jo Faraci as Doreen Mahoney
 Robert Belushi as Sean Mahoney
 Rebecca Spence as Carla Mahoney
 Heidi Johanningmeier as Giselle Brousard
Jet Eveleth as Bridal Clerk

Production

Filming took place in Chicago, Illinois, and Los Angeles, California.  As a Chicago native, director John Burgess, having attended film school at USC, wanted to go back to his hometown to make his first feature film.  To put together the cast, he called upon two veteran casting directors: Monika Mikkelsen in Los Angeles, and Claire Simon in Chicago.  To keep costs down, the production cast locally in both cities except for the lead roles of Josh and Molly.  Mikkelsen had cast Shane McRae in previous projects and pitched him to play Josh Shiffman.  Reels had been sent from various talent agencies and John Burgess came across Aubrey Dollar for Molly Mahoney.  Both actors lived in New York and were flown to Chicago and Los Angeles for filming.

The production wanted an established actor with a familiar face to anchor the story and play the dying father.  Daniel J. Travanti, a local Chicagoan who had received Emmy and Golden Globes awards, was offered and accepted the role.  Janet Ulrich Brooks was then cast as Josh's mom, Frida Shiffman, and Mary Jo Faraci as Molly's mom, Doreen Mahoney, who with their matching red hair could easily be mistaken for the real life mother of Aubrey.  Ron Dean, a staple in the Chicago acting community from such films as The Breakfast Club, The Fugitive, and The Dark Knight, accepted the role of Art Burke, Molly's step dad to be, and the parents were all cast.  Robert Belushi, well known in Chicago's theater and sketch comedy scene at Second City and Improv Olympic, was cast to play the best friend and over-protective brother, Sean Mahoney, while Rebecca Spence, another staple in the Chicago acting community was subsequently cast as his wife, Molly's sister-in-law, Carla Mahoney.  Lastly, to round out the main cast a femme fatale was needed to throw a monkey wrench into Josh and Molly getting together too quickly.  A local actress, Heidi Johanningmeier, who actually first came in to read for the role of Molly, was instead offered the role of Giselle Brousard.

The department heads were filled with local stars from Chicago's independent filmmaking scene.  Tari Segal was hired to shoot the film.  She had just wrapped shooting Phedon Popamichael's feature film, Lost Angeles, whom she had interned for a few years earlier on the film he was shooting, Sideways, while she was still attending Columbia College Chicago.  Adri Siriwatt was hired as the production designer.  Adri came in for the interview covered in paint from a production that she was working on and the producers could tell she wasn't afraid to do whatever it took to get the job done, even if it meant getting her hands dirty.  Aly Barohn was hired as the costume designer.  The producers' first meeting with Aly was very similar: she had a quirky style and impressive knowledge of current fashion trends that were going on in Venice Beach and Hollywood out on the West Coast, all the way to the Midwest styles that were dominating every age group in the city of Chicago.

Principal photography began in Chicago the last week in October, and many of the crew dressed up in costume on Halloween while filming overnight at O'Hare International Airport.  The Windy City portion of the shoot was wrapped up just before Thanksgiving, and then the production was off to Los Angeles for scenes in Hollywood, Venice Beach, and Burbank.  When shooting was wrapped in California, John Burgess headed back to Chicago to begin post-production.  Ryan Koscielniak, the editor of John's USC graduate thesis film, The Powder Puff Principle, had set up shop in Evanston, IL.  The production couldn't afford to hire Ryan full-time, so they started meeting on nights and weekends.  The process took longer, but it enabled the production to keep costs down to save what money was left for color timing, sound mixing, and music licensing.  The production utilized Illinois' 30% film tax credit for finishing funds and completed all post-production activities locally at the famed Chicago Recording Company and Filmworker's Club.

Release 
One Small Hitch premiered at the California Independent Film Festival on November 8, 2012.

It was released theatrically in the United States on February 6, 2015.

Reception 
The Radio Times rated it 2/5 stars and called it a "by-the-numbers romantic comedy".

Awards 

 Best Picture Comedy – California Independent Film Festival (2012)
 Best Production Design – Hollywood Reel Independent Film Festival (2012)
 Best Picture Comedy – Cinequest (2013)
 Best Picture Comedy – Sedona International Film Festival (2013)
 Best Feature Film – Omaha Film Festival (2013)
 Audience Award – Bahamas International Film Festival (2013)
 Best Ensemble Cast – Chicago Comedy Film Festival (2013)
 Best Screenplay – L.A. Comedy Film Festival (2013)
 Best Director – Laugh Or Die Film Festival (2013)
 Best Director – Stony Brook Film Festival (2013)
 Rising Star – Naples International Film Festival (2013)
 Award of Merit – The Indie Fest (2014)
 Audience Award – Durango Film Festival (2014)
 Special Jury Commendation – Durango Film Festival (2014)
 Award of Excellence – Accolade Competition (2014)

Soundtrack 
"White Dress" – Ben Rector
"Cold Shoulders" – Gold Motel
"Spirit Of Waste" – Goodbye Satellite
"Little Horn" – Suns
"The Joker" – Ives The Band
"Hearts Don't Beat Right" – New Cassettes
"Take It Easy" – Francis
"Hymn 101" – Joe Pug
"421" – The Wildbirds
"Hiding – This Is Me Smiling
"Falling Apart" – The Sleeptalkers
"Beam Me Up" – Go Back To The Zoo
"Puppet" – Brian Lee
"Stay" – Dot Dot Dot
"Chupacabra" – Flatbed Orange
"Now The Rabbit Has The Gun" – Now The Rabbit Has The Gun
"For Your Love" – Marching Band
"Dope Fiend" – Jaime Wyatt
"Right Or Reason" – The Blissters
"Closer" – Sabrosa Purr
"Both Young & Wild" – Aktar Aktar
"Safe & Sound" – Capital Cities
"Poison & Wine" – The Civil Wars 
"One Day" – Erin Martin
"Terrified" – Kevin Andrew Prchal
"Stockholm" – Brian McSweeney
"Jag Alskar Dig" – Volcanoes Make Islands
"Under Your Wings I'll Hide" – Immanu El
"This Is For You" – David Dunn

References

External links 
 
 

2012 films
2012 romantic comedy films
American independent films
American romantic comedy films
Films about weddings
2012 independent films
2010s English-language films
2010s American films